Reinier Cartaya (born 22 January 1981) is a Cuban cyclist. He competed in the men's team sprint at the 2004 Summer Olympics.

References

External links
 

1981 births
Living people
Cuban male cyclists
Olympic cyclists of Cuba
Cyclists at the 2004 Summer Olympics
Place of birth missing (living people)
Pan American Games medalists in cycling
Pan American Games gold medalists for Cuba
Cyclists at the 2003 Pan American Games
Medalists at the 2003 Pan American Games